List of wars involving Morocco and the former entities that ruled the current Morocco.

Marinid Sultanate (1244–1465)

Wattasid Sultanate (1472–1554)

Saadi Sultanate (1510–1659)

Alaouite Sultanate (1668–1912)

Kingdom of Morocco (1956–present)

References 

Morocco
Wars involving Morocco
Wars